Jaime Giralt Casanova (13 January 1902 – 12 May 1988) was a Spanish rower. He competed in two events at the 1924 Summer Olympics.

References

External links
 

1902 births
1988 deaths
Spanish male rowers
Olympic rowers of Spain
Rowers at the 1924 Summer Olympics
Rowers from Barcelona